The Department of Agriculture, Forestry and Fisheries was one of the departments of the South African government. It was responsible for overseeing and supporting South Africa's agricultural sector, as well as ensuring access to sufficient, safe and nutritious food by the country's population. The department fell under the responsibility of the Minister of Agriculture, Forestry and Fisheries. In 2010 the minister was Senzeni Zokwana. In the 2014 national budget, the department received an appropriation of R6,178 billion rand, and had 5,924 employees as of 2010.

In June 2019 government departments were reconfigured. The agriculture function of DAFF became part of the new Department of Agriculture, Land Reform and Rural Development, while the forestry and fisheries functions became part of the Department of Environment, Forestry and Fisheries.

References

External links
 Official website
 Gazette Notices per Department of Agriculture, Forestry and Fisheries

Agriculture
Agriculture, Forestry and Fisheries
Agricultural organisations based in South Africa
South Africa
South Africa
South Africa
Forestry in South Africa
Natural resources in Africa